CEN/TC 434 (CEN Technical Committee 434) is a technical body within the European Committee for Standardization (CEN) developing standards in the field of Electronic Invoicing.

Overview 
CEN/TC 434 has developed the European Standard on Electronic Invicing (EN 16931–1) and other ancillary standardization deliverables required by the European Directive 2014/55/EU.

Directive 2014/55/EU also required: the test of the standard as to its practical application for an end user,
 a report on the outcome of the test to the European Parliament and the Council by the European Commission and, after the publication and the test of the standard,
 the publication in the Official Journal of the European Union of a reference to the European Standard together with the list of a limited number of syntaxes (that CEN published as TS 16931-2).

Workgroups 
CEN/TC 434 has the following working groups (WGs):
 CEN/TC 434/WG 1     Core semantic data model
 CEN/TC 434/WG 3     Syntax bindings
 CEN/TC 434/WG 4     Guidelines at transmission level
 CEN/TC 434/WG 5     Extension methodology
 CEN/TC 434/WG 6     Test methodology and test results
 CEN/TC 434/WG 7     Registry Services

CEN/TC 434/WG 2 (List of syntaxes) was disbanded.

Published Standards 

EN 16931-1:2017 Electronic invoicing - Part 1: Semantic data model of the core elements of an electronic invoice (published on 2017-06-28)
CEN/TS 16931-2:2017 Electronic invoicing - Part 2: List of syntaxes that comply with EN 16931-1 (published on 2017-06-28)
CEN/TS 16931-3-1:2017 Electronic invoicing - Part 3-1: Methodology for syntax bindings of the core elements of an electronic invoice (published on 2017-07-05)
CEN/TS 16931-3-2:2017/AC:2018 Electronic invoicing - Part 3-2: Syntax binding for ISO/IEC 19845 (UBL 2.1) invoice and credit note (published on 2018-07-18)
CEN/TS 16931-3-3:2017 Electronic invoicing - Part 3-3: Syntax binding for UN/CEFACT XML Industry Invoice D16B (published on 2017-10-18)
CEN/TS 16931-3-4:2017 Electronic invoicing - Part 3-4: Syntax binding for UN/EDIFACT INVOIC D16B (published on 2017-10-18)
CEN/TR 16931-4:2017 Electronic invoicing - Part 4: Guidelines on interoperability of electronic invoices at the transmission level (published on 2017-07-05)
CEN/TR 16931-5:2017 Electronic invoicing - Part 5: Guidelines on the use of sector or country extensions in conjunction with EN 16931–1, methodology to be applied in the real environment (published on 2017-07-05)
CEN/TR 16931-6:2017 Electronic invoicing - Part 6: Result of the test of EN 16931–1 with respect to its practical application for an end user (published on 2017-10-18)

Thanks to an  agreement between CEN and the European Commission EN 16931-1:2017 and CEN/TS 16931-2:2017 are available free of charge from the CEN members (i.e. the European national standardization bodies).

Validation artefacts 
Schematron validation artefacts for UBL, CII and XML EDIFACT invoices, complant with EN 16931-1 are available here.

See also 
 List of CEN technical committees
 CEN/TC 434 page on CEN site
 CEN/TC 434 published standards
 CEF Digital
 CEF Digital — eInvoicing

References 

CEN technical committees
EN standards